Giovanni Raboni (22 January 1932 – 16 September 2004) was an Italian poet, translator and literary critic.

Biography 
Raboni was born in Milan, the second son of Giuseppe, a clerk at Milan commune, and Matilde Sommariva. In October 1942, after the first bombings of Milan, the family moved to Sant'Ambrogio Olona, near Varese, where Raboni concluded his primary and intermediate school. His father's love for French and Russian classics made him read and appreciate Proust, Dickens, Dostoevskij and when his cousin Giandomenico Guarino, knowledgeable about contemporary literature and poetry, found shelter in Sant'Ambrogio too after 8 September 1943 armistice, Raboni met the works by Piovene, Buzzati, Ungaretti, Quasimodo, Cardarelli, and Montale about whom he said: I know I owe much to Montale, I realise this upon rereading him, even if I did not love him as much as Eliot and Sereni, but he affected me a lot... especially his expression of the limits, of the fact that we cannot demand too much in 20th century of poetry as a source of truth.

Having completed law studies, he was a lawyer for some years, but at the end of the 1950s he felt more attracted to literature and poetry. He met in Milan Vittorio Sereni, Antonio Porta, Giovanni Testori, Giorgio Strehler and began working for periodical and newspapers, at first in the editorial staff of Aut aut, a magazine edited by Enzo Paci, then writing for Piergiorgio Bellocchio's Quaderni Piacentini and Roberto Longhi's Paragone and finally for Corriere della Sera for which worked several years.

Raboni became was appreciated as both a literary critic and a translator of classic works: he translated in Italian some works by Gustave Flaubert, and by Guillaume Apollinaire, Les Fleurs du mal by Charles Baudelaire for Einaudi publishing house, Jean Racine and Proust's In Search of Lost Time in Mondadori's "I Meridiani" collection.

In 1961 he published two short poetry collections, Il catalogo è questo and L'insalubrità dell'aria, followed by Le case della Vetra in 1966, Cadenza d'inganno in 1975, Nel grave sogno in 1982 and, in 1988, the anthology A tanto caro sangue. In the 1970s he began editing the poetry series "I quaderni della Fenice" for Guanda publishing house, acting as a kind of talent-scout for new poets. Milan (especially the memory of the old city, before the recent town plannings) is in the heart of his matters:

In June 1971 he was one of the 800 intellectuals who signed, in L'Espresso magazine, a manifesto against Luigi Calabresi, a police officer falsely suspected of having killed the anarchist Giuseppe Pinelli. In October he was among those who signed a "self-denunciation", to express solidarity with some journalists of Lotta Continua newspaper, defending their strong anti-government positions.

Among his literary critic essays are Poesia degli anni sessanta (Poetry of the 1960s) published in 1968, Quaderno in prosa in 1981. La fossa di Cherubino (1980) collects his proses.

Raboni was interested in theater too: was in the directorial committee of Piccolo Teatro di Milano and wrote several plays, such as Alcesti o la recita dell'esilio and Rappresentazione della croce (2000). His activity as a poet went on with Canzonette mortali (1987), Versi guerrieri e amorosi (1990), Ogni terzo pensiero (1993, with which he won the Viareggio Prize for poetry), Quare tristis (1998), and Barlumi di Storia (2002).

Giovanni Raboni died of a heart attack in Parma in 2004. He is buried at the Monumental Cemetery of Milan.

His wife, poet Patrizia Valduga, wrote the afterword to his last poetry collection Ultimi versi, published posthumously in 2006; one of his last poems is "Canzone del danno e della beffa" (Song of the harm and the hoax), also published posthumous on Corriere della Sera in 2004.

Andrea Cortellessa, on an article of Manifesto in the days after his death, remembers the poet's “obsessive mournful compulsion on his last poetic verses”,  with these significant lines from Quare tristis: "Who dreams himself / alive with his own dead / maybe he doesn’t live also there /in his dream,/ and you must let him lie – not still /wake up, not until // out, in the light, remains that squeaky / burden, that blinding plate…"

Notes and references

Bibliography 

Poetry
Il catalogo è questo: quindici poesie, Lampugnani Nigri, con nota di Carlo Bertocchi, Milan, 1961
L'insalubrità dell'aria, All'insegna del pesce d'oro, Vanni Scheiwiller, Milan, 1963
 Le case della Vetra, Mondadori, Milan, 1966
Gesta romanorum: 20 poesie, Lampugnani Nigri, Milan, 1967
Economia della paura, All'insegna del pesce d'oro, Vanni Scheiwiller, Milan, 1971
Cadenza d'inganno, Mondadori, Milan, 1975
Il più freddo anno di grazia, San Marco dei Giustiniani, Genoa, 1978
Nel grave sogno, Mondadori, Milan, 1982
Raboni, Manzoni, Il ventaglio, Milan, 1985
Canzonette mortali, Crocetti, Milan, 1987
A tanto caro sangue: Poesie 1953-1987, Mondadori, Milan, 1988
Transeuropa, Mondadori, Milan, 1988
Versi guerrieri e amorosi, Einaudi, Turin, 1990
Un gatto più un gatto, with illustrations by Nicoletta Costa, Mondadori, Milan, 1991
Ogni terzo pensiero, Mondadori, Milan, 1993
Devozioni perverse, Rizzoli, Milan, 1994
Nel libro della mente, with seven etchings by Attilio Steffanoni, All'insegna del pesce d'oro, Vanni Scheiwiller, Milan, 1997
Quare tristis, Mondadori, Milan, 1998
Rappresentazione della croce, Garzanti, Milan, 1997, 20002
Tutte le poesie (1951–1998), Garzanti, Milan, 2000
Alcesti o la recita dell'esilio, Garzanti, Milan, 2002
Barlumi di storia, Mondadori, Milan, 2002
Ultimi versi, afterword by Patrizia Valduga, posthumous, Garzanti, Milan, 2006

Essays
Poesia degli anni sessanta, Editori Riuniti, Rome, 1976
Poesia italiana contemporanea, Sansoni, Florence, 1980
Quaderno in prosa, Lampugnani Nigri, Milano, 1981
Baj. Idraulica, with Gillo Dorfles, Skira, Edizioni d'arte, Milan, 2003
La poesia che si fa. Critica e storia del Novecento poetico italiano 1959-2004, Garzanti, Milan, 2005
 
Prose
La fossa di Cherubino, Guanda, Milan, 1980

External links 
  (partially in Italian)
Biography and some poems 
Some poems 

1932 births
2004 deaths
Writers from Milan
Italian male poets
20th-century Italian poets
20th-century Italian male writers